Hidden Valley Lake is a census-designated place (CDP) and gated subdivision in Lake County, California, United States. The population was 6,235 at the 2020 census, up from 5,579 at the 2010 census.  Today, it is a CID (Common Interest Development) known as Hidden Valley Lake Association (HVLA).

History
In October 2014, The State Water Resources Control Board ordered the Hidden Valley Lake Community Services District to stop allowing new service connections to its water system due to concerns that, under current drought conditions, the district did not have enough water to meet future demands. The district, with about 2,500 connections, is a junior water rights holder in the Sacramento River and San Joaquin River watersheds. November 2020 the water moratorium was lifted and new water rights are currently available through the District, but at a much higher price point.

Geography
In the west of the town, California State Route 29 runs through the town limits.

Demographics

2010
The 2010 United States Census reported that Hidden Valley Lake had a population of 5,579. The racial makeup of Hidden Valley Lake was 4,830 (86.6%) White, 63 (1.1%) African American, 80 (1.4%) Native American, 75 (1.3%) Asian, 12 (0.2%) Pacific Islander, 326 (5.8%) from other races, and 193 (3.5%) from two or more races. Hispanic or Latino of any race were 733 persons (13.1%).

The Census reported that 5,575 people (99.9% of the population) lived in households, 4 (0.1%) lived in non-institutionalized group quarters, and 0 (0%) were institutionalized.

There were 2,119 households, out of which 752 (35.5%) had children under the age of 18 living in them, 1,291 (60.9%) were opposite-sex married couples living together, 206 (9.7%) had a female householder with no husband present, 93 (4.4%) had a male householder with no wife present.  There were 155 (7.3%) unmarried opposite-sex partnerships, and 23 (1.1%) same-sex married couples or partnerships. 388 households (18.3%) were made up of individuals, and 138 (6.5%) had someone living alone who was 65 years of age or older. The average household size was 2.63.  There were 1,590 families (75.0% of all households); the average family size was 2.98.

The population was spread out, with 1,400 people (25.1%) under the age of 18, 296 people (5.3%) aged 18 to 24, 1,413 people (25.3%) aged 25 to 44, 1,706 people (30.6%) aged 45 to 64, and 764 people (13.7%) who were 65 years of age or older.  The median age was 41.2 years. For every 100 females, there were 97.2 males.  For every 100 females age 18 and over, there were 95.8 males.

The homeowner vacancy rate was 6.1%; the rental vacancy rate was 8.2%.  4,274 people (76.6% of the population) lived in owner-occupied housing units and 1,301 people (23.3%) lived in rental housing units.

2000
As of the census of 2000, there were 3,777 people, 1,411 households, and 1,100 families residing in the CDP. The ethnic or racial makeup of the CDP was 92.82% White, 0.71% Black or African American, 1.03% Native American, 0.74% Asian, 0.19% Pacific Islander, 1.77% from other races, and 2.73% from two or more races.  6.75% of the population were Hispanic or Latino of any race.

There were 1,411 households, out of which 35.4% had children under the age of 18 living with them, 67.2% were married couples living together, 7.2% had a female householder with no husband present, and 22.0% were non-families. 16.5% of all households were made up of individuals, and 6.9% had someone living alone who was 65 years of age or older.  The average household size was 2.67 and the average family size was 3.01.

In the CDP, the population was spread out, with 28.0% under the age of 18, 4.2% from 18 to 24, 27.5% from 25 to 44, 24.5% from 45 to 64, and 15.8% who were 65 years of age or older.  The median age was 40 years. For every 100 females, there were 102.6 males.  For every 100 females age 18 and over, there were 97.6 males.

The median income for a household in the CDP was $48,262, and the median income for a family was $51,763. Males had a median income of $41,278 versus $27,813 for females. The per capita income for the CDP was $19,526.  About 4.1% of families and 7.6% of the population were below the poverty line, including 7.5% of those under age 18 and 4.3% of those age 65 or over.

Government

Hidden Valley Lake ( Hidden Valley Lake Association), as a CID or Homeowners Association, is a non-profit corporation under California law and is covered by the California Corporations Code and the Davis-Stirling Act. The former covers all functioning related to non-profit corporations, while the latter specifically covers homeowner associations (HOAs) in the state. There is no single state agency charged with regulating HOAs, i.e., no agency that is known to take an active role in addressing violations of the law within HOAs.

References

External links
 Hidden Valley Lake Association, Official Website
 Community profile
 Hidden Valley Lake California Resource Guide
 Hidden Valley Lake Owner Advocate - http://www.hvlowneradvocate.x10host.com/
 Hidden Valley Watchdog - https://www.facebook.com/groups/hiddenvalleywatchdog/

Census-designated places in Lake County, California
Census-designated places in California